Gordon K. Larson (June 15, 1924 – June 12, 2005) was a basketball player, American football coach, and college athletics administrator in Ohio.  He served as the head coach at the University of Akron from 1961 to 1972, compiling a record of 74–33–5.  Larson's 74 wins are second most in the history of the Akron Zips football program, trailing only the 80 tallied by his assistant and successor, Jim Dennison.  Larson died at the age of 80 on June 12, 2005, at his home in The Villages, Florida.

Head coaching record

College

References

1924 births
2005 deaths
American men's basketball players
Akron Zips athletic directors
Akron Zips football coaches
Bowling Green Falcons men's basketball players
Ohio State Buckeyes football coaches
High school football coaches in Ohio
Kent State University alumni
United States Navy personnel of World War II
United States Navy sailors
People from The Villages, Florida
Basketball players from Akron, Ohio